Marie-Annick Dézert (10 May 1972 - 29 August 2019) was a French professional handball goalkeeper.

Biography

Marie-Annick Dézert was born in Vire, France on 10 May 1972.

She played for the French national team from 1990 and 2001. She was vice-world champion in 1999.

In her club career, Dézert had worn the colors of Dreux AC for two seasons from 1989 to 1991, in National 1A. After the relegation of the team, she then moved to the Stade français Issy (1991-1994), before a long adventure at the Cercle Dijon Bourgogne from 1994 to 2003, only interrupted by a year at Béthune between 1996 and 1997. She retired in 2005, after two final seasons at Toulon Saint-Cyr VHB.

Marie-Annick Dézert died in Dijon on 29 August 2019.

References

1972 births
2019 deaths
French female handball players
People from Vire
Sportspeople from Calvados (department)